Ruiban-e Kuchak (also Romanized as Rū’ībān-e Kūchak; also known as Ḩeydarīyeh Kūchak and Rūbīān-e Kūchak) is a village in Howmeh Rural District, in the Central District of Gilan-e Gharb County, Kermanshah Province, Iran. At the 2006 census, its population was 85, in 18 families. The village is populated by Kurds.

References 

Populated places in Gilan-e Gharb County
Kurdish settlements in Kermanshah Province